The 1938 Wyoming gubernatorial election took place on November 8, 1938.  Incumbent Democratic Governor Leslie A. Miller ran for re-election to his third term, and his second full term. Nels H. Smith, a former State Representative and former state highway commissioner, won a crowded Republican primary and advanced to the general election against Miller. Though Miller won his re-election campaign four years earlier in a landslide, Smith was able to take advantage of the nationwide Republican wave to defeat him in a landslide, winning 60% of the vote to Governor Miller's 40%.

Democratic primary

Candidates
 Leslie A. Miller, incumbent Governor
 Gus F. Engelking, rancher

Results

Republican Primary

Candidates
 Nels H. Smith, former state highway commissioner, former State Representative, 1934 Republican candidate for Governor
 Thomas A. Nicholas, former Campbell County Prosecuting Attorney
 Josiah H. Holland, Mayor of Evanston
 John F. Raper, Sheridan attorney
 Samuel S. Hoover, Mayor of Green River, former State Representative

Results

Results

References

1938 Wyoming elections
1938
Wyoming
November 1938 events